Uboat is a submarine simulator video game, released by Deep Water Studio and being published by PlayWay S.A. The game is inspired by the game mechanics of Fallout Shelter, XCOM, and also the movie Das Boot. Like other submarine simulation games, such as the Silent Hunter series, the player is put in command of a German U-boat during World War II.

Development 
Initially, development of the game started in 2016 with a Kickstarter campaign to provide funding for the project. The original goal of the project was to raise CA$20,000 to fund the project but the campaign managed to raise CA$38,000 from 1,511 backers. The team developing the game are reportedly "a mix of young open-minded people and old hands at game development". Significant amounts of the game have already been completed and according to the most recent developer diary the game is "getting more and more full of shape". Originally release was planned for 2017. but it has been delayed and is now expected in the first quarter of 2019. A beta was released to Kickstarter backers on October 14, 2018 and has been updated frequently since then. The game was called Uboot during the first few years of development.

Overview 
Uboat gives players command of a Type VII submarine during World War II. The player is not in charge of the submarine itself but in fact "in charge of the men controlling the submarine" as a U-Boat captain. The player has to manage the morale, discipline and trauma of the crew and make sure all the crew come back alive at the end of a mission. The crew are also made up of individuals who each have their own individual stories and personalities. According to Rock, Paper, Shotgun, "Everything has been created down to the tiniest of details to make sure WWII buffs get what they want, and realistic and modern graphics are promised as well." The developers have also developed precise and historically accurate interior of the ship to further enhance gameplay and give the player the ability to take control of certain tasks on the ship themselves such as firing torpedoes, using radios and piloting the submarine.

Release 
Uboat released on 30 April 2019 in Early access to the public, some Kickstarter contributors who had received the game earlier during beta and alpha testing were released from non-disclosure agreements and allowed to post videos and media of the game. It is not published.

Reception 
Reception for the game is currently generally positive. Polygon writer, Charlie Hall, wrote that "there’s a brilliant experience lurking in its depths". He praised the effort the developers had gone to making an authentic experience, but stated concerns about how early access the release was and that the game lacked game-play due to large amounts of bugs.

See also 
 Das Boot
 Silent Hunter III
 Submarine warfare

Notes

External links 

 Kickstarter Project Main Page

References 

Upcoming video games
Early access video games
Kickstarter-funded video games
MacOS games
Naval video games
PlayWay games
Single-player video games
Submarine simulation video games
Video games developed in Poland
Windows games
World War II video games